Coele Syria (Koílē Syría) was a Roman province which Septimius Severus created with Syria Phoenice in 198 by dividing the province of Syria. Its metropolis was Antioch.

History
As related by Theodor Mommsen,

Coele Syria was further divided into Syria Prima and Syria Secunda around the end of the fourth century.

It is widely accepted that the term Coele is a transcription of Aramaic kul, meaning "all, the entire", such that the term originally identified all of Syria. The word "Coele", which literally means "hollow" in Koine Greek, is thought to have come about via a folk etymology referring to the "hollow" Beqaa Valley between Mount Lebanon and the Anti-Lebanon Mountains.

References

Bibliography
 
 
 

Provinces of the Roman Empire